Tekanpur may refer to: 
Tekanpur, India
Tekanpur, Nepal